Jean-Patrice Brosse (23 June 1950 – 18 September 2021) was a French harpsichordist and organist.

Biography 
Born in Le Mans on 23 June 1950, Brosse gradually followed a complete artistic training at the conservatory of Le Mans (harpsichord with Françoise Petit, organ, chamber music, writing, conducting), Conservatoire de Paris, the Accademia Musicale Chigiana, and the École nationale supérieure des beaux-arts of Paris (in architecture).

He was then the appreciated partner of great interpreters such as Henryk Szeryng, Jean-Pierre Wallez, Jean-Pierre Rampal, Maurice André, Frédéric Lodéon, Arto Noras... and accompanied singers such as Gundula Janowitz, Rita Streich, Hugues Cuénod, Isabel Garcisanz, Derek Lee Ragin, Michel Sénéchal and Cecilia Bartoli.

He participated in the activities of the Jeunesses musicales de France, for which he gave numerous concerts, and then recorded his first records as soloist: complete works by Henry Purcell, Clérambault and Jacques Duphly EMI, Bach's sonatas with Jean-Pierre Wallez at IPG (later reissued by Universal). He played the great orchestral works: Poulenc's Concertos for harpsichord and organ, Camille Saint-Saëns's Symphony with organ, Manuel de Falla's and Frank Martin's Concertos, Sauguet's Church sonata... with the biggest ensembles: Monte-Carlo, RAI, National et Philharmonique de Radio-France, Orchestre national des Pays de la Loire, Capitole de Toulouse..., under the direction of Georges Prêtre (with whom he recorded Poulenc's Concert Champêtre for EMI), Emmanuel Krivine, Jean-Pierre Marty, Marek Janowski, Michel Plasson... Henri Sauguet wrote his Church sonata to him (issued by Arion), Jean-Michel Damase's Pastorales for organ, Joaquin Nin-Culmell's Symphonie des Mystères...

Deepening the study of baroque treaties and instruments, he founded the Concerto Rococo (with Alice Piérot and Paul Carlioz), a small group of early instruments dedicated to the 18th century harpsichord and concert organ repertoire (Bach, Johann Schobert, Claude Balbastre, Michel Corrette, Mozart, Soler, Haydn...). Through his musicological research, Jean-Patrice Brosse also worked on the restitution of baroque religious services alternating organ and Gregorian chant. (Messe Agatange, Messe de Bordeaux, Vœu de Louis XIII...), and ensured the revision of old works at Éditions J. M. Fuzeau (Johann Schobert, Antonio Soler etc.).

He performed in most European countries, in the US, in South America, in the Far East, in tours - often illustrated with lectures and master classes - or in prestigious festivals: Echternach, Brussels, Antwerp, Frankfurt, Berlin, Dresden, Bonn, Düsseldorf, Amsterdam, Rotterdam, The Hague, Vienna, Budapest, Belgrade, Zagreb, Warsaw, Istanbul, Madrid, Milan, Naples, Hong Kong.

Brosse made a series of recordings dedicated to the Parisian harpsichordists of the Enlightenment era (Michel Corrette, Claude Balbastre, Armand-Louis Couperin, Joseph Nicolas Pancrace Royer, Simon Simon, Jacques Duphly...), in parallel with the work he wrote on this subject, Le Clavecin des Lumières for Bleu nuit publisher. He is also the author of Le clavecin du Roi Soleil. The musical and literary richness of this period inspired him to create a poetic evocation, "Le Soir des Lumières", which he shared on stage with the actress Françoise Fabian, as well as a series of concerts-readings Mozart et le clavecin des Lumières and Les derniers jours du Roi Soleil after Saint-Simon's Mémoires. With Marie-Christine Barrault, he also conceived a series of poetic and musical shows around works ranging from the Renaissance to the present day.

His eclectic tastes also made him approach the repertoire of the romantic and contemporary organ.

Jean-Patrice Brosse held the rank of chevalier of the Ordre des Arts et des Lettres.

Brosse died on 18 September 2021 at the age of 71 due to a cancer.

Discography 
Arion:
 Nicolas Lebègue:
 Premier Livre d'orgue (July 1981, Arion ARN268561) 
 Troisième livre d’orgue 2 CDs  1982
 L’Orgue français à la Renaissance  1983
 Claude Balbastre: Noëls pour orgue  1983
 Mélodies espagnoles (with Isabel Garcisanz)  1984
 Henri Sauguet: Sonate d’église (dir. J.W. Audoli)  1988
 Mozart : Church sonatas (with the Concerto Rococo) 2002
EMI :
 Louis-Nicolas Clérambault: L’œuvre d’orgue et de clavecin  1978
 Henry Purcell: L’œuvre d’orgue et de clavecin 2 CD  1979
 Jacques Duphly: L’œuvre de clavecin 3 CD  1980
 Francis Poulenc: Concert Champêtre pour clavecin et orchestre (dir. Georges Prêtre)  1984
Saphir:
 Bach: Toccatas, Fantaisies, Préludes and fugues 2008
Triton: 
 Messe de Bordeaux (with the Vox Cantoris choir)  2007
Universal:
 Bach: 6 Sonatas for violin and harpsichord (with Jean-Pierre Wallez)  2000
Verany:
 Batailles à Versailles  1986
 Le Concert des oiseaux à Versailles  1986
 Le Clavecin au siècle de Louis XIV  1987
 Le Siècle d’or du clavecin  1987
 Le Clavecin au siècle des Lumières  1987
 Bach: Les Concertos pour orgue  1987
 Bach: Grandes œuvres pour orgue  1987
 Le Clavecin à la fin de l’Ancien Régime  1989
 Bach: La Clavierübung III  1990
 Johann Schobert: Trios (with the Concerto Rococo)  1991
 Schobert: Quatuors (with the Concerto Rococo)  1992 
 Michel Corrette : Concertos pour orgue (with the Concerto Rococo) 1993
 Bach: Variations canoniques et Partitas pour orgue  1993
 Claude Balbastre: Quatuors (with the Concerto Rococo)  1994
 Jean-François Dandrieu : Messe et Vêpres de Pâques (Chœur grégorien de Paris)  1994
 François d'Agincourt: Messe  de l’Assomption (with the Chœur Antiphona)  1996
 Dandrieu: Vêpres de l’Assomption (with the Chœur Antiphona)  1996
 Mathieu Lanes : Messe Agatange (with the Antiphona and the Concerto Rococo)  1998
 Soler: Quintettes pour clavecin et cordes (2 CD) (Concerto Rococo)  1999
 Balbastre: Livre de clavecin  1999
 Michel Corrette: Livre de clavecin  2001
 Armand-Louis Couperin: Livre de clavecin  2001
 Pancrace Royer: Livre de clavecin  2003
 Jacques Duphly: Les quatre livres de clavecin  2004
 Simon Simon: Livre de clavecin  2006
 Balbastre: Pièces de clavecin manuscrites  2006
 Corrette: Les Amusements de Parnasse  II et III 2007
Virgin:
 François Couperin : Messe des paroisses, messe des couvents 2 CD  1996

Fac-simile editions
 Johann Schobert: Sonatas op. I, II, II, XVII (Fuzeau)
 Johann Schobert: Sonatas en quatuor op. VII (Fuzeau)
 Soler: 6 Quintets for Harpsichord and Strings (Fuzeau)

References

External links 
 Jean-Patrice Brosse, directeur artistique du festival du Comminges (ResMusic)
 Official website
 Jean-Patrice Brosse's discography (Discogs)
 Jean Patrice Brosse - Balbastre - Sonatas (YouTube)

French harpsichordists
French classical organists
French male organists
École des Beaux-Arts alumni
1950 births
2021 deaths
People from Le Mans
Chevaliers of the Ordre des Arts et des Lettres
21st-century organists
21st-century French male musicians
Male classical organists